Verkhovna Rada of Crimea or the Supreme Council of Crimea, officially the Supreme Council of the Autonomous Republic of Crimea was the acting Ukrainian legislative body for the Autonomous Republic of Crimea before the annexation of Crimea by Russia in 2014.

The last election of parliament took place on 31 October 2010 (see 2010 Crimean parliamentary election) and was won by the Party of Regions and the Communist Party of Ukraine.

On 27 February 2014, unidentified armed men took over the parliament and hoisted a Russian flag over it. On 15 March 2014 the Verkhovna Rada of Ukraine officially dissolved the parliament. On 17 March 2014, one day before the Russian annexation of Crimea, a puppet State Council of Crimea was established in place of the Verkhovna Rada of Crimea.

Last election

See also
 State Council of Crimea

References

1991 establishments in Ukraine
2014 disestablishments in Ukraine
Politics of Crimea
Crimea
Crimea
Annexation of Crimea by the Russian Federation